Three Rivers Arts Festival is an outdoor music and arts festival held each June in the Downtown district of Pittsburgh, Pennsylvania. The festival features live music and performance art, as well as visual art and vendors who sell their wares. The event is centered in Point State Park.

Founded in 1960 by the Women's Committee of the Carnegie Museum of Art, the festival has presented more than 10,000 visual and performing artists. Stage performances have included Ella Fitzgerald, Ray Charles, Philip Glass, Steven Reich, Smokey Robinson as well as literary legends Allen Ginsberg and Spalding Gray.

Since 2015, the CREATE festival has been part of the Three Rivers Arts Festival.

Most outdoor events were cancelled in 2020 due to the COVID-19 pandemic; some went virtual.

The Three Rivers Arts Festival Gallery, located at 937 Liberty Avenue, is a year-round extension of the Three Rivers Arts Festival.

References

External links

Three Rivers Arts Festival
Post-Gazette History of the Three Rivers Arts Festival
Article on 25th anniversary in 1984
CREATE Festival 

Performing arts in Pittsburgh
Festivals in Pittsburgh
Music festivals in Pennsylvania
Recurring events established in 1959
Music festivals established in 1959